E. Sundaramoorthy is a Tamil scholar, professor and writer.

Birth 
He was born in 1942 in Vellalur in Coimbatore district, Tamil Nadu, India.

Academic career 
He worked in the departments of Tamil language, Tamil literature and publication of University of Madras in various capacities for 32 years.  From December 19, 2001, to December 18, 2004, he was the Vice chancellor of Tamil University in Thanjavur. He worked in Central Institute of Classical Tamil from 2008 to 2014 as Senior Fellow. Now he is appointed as the Vice Chairperson of CICT.

Works 
He wrote mote than 70 books on various subjects including manuscriptology, publishing, grammar, and stylistics and 260 articles. He got more than 20 awards including the Tirukkural Award from the Government of Tamil Nadu.

Overseas trips
In connection with the Tamil research works he went to United States of America, Germany, Sri Lanka and Malaysia. He presented a research paper in the World Tamil Conference held at Chicago.

References 

1942 births
Living people
Scholars from Tamil Nadu
Indian Tamil academics
Heads of universities and colleges in India
People from Coimbatore district